= Peripheral unit =

Peripheral unit may refer to:

- Peripheral unit (country subdivision)
- Peripheral, computer hardware
